Balance of power may refer to:

Politics and international relations
 Balance of power (international relations), parity or stability between competing forces
 Balance of power (federalism), distribution of power between a central government and its subnational governments
 Balance of power (parliament), power exercised by a minor political party whose support enables a minority government to obtain office
 European balance of power, European international relations before the First World War

Arts and entertainment
 Balance of Power (album), by Electric Light Orchestra, 1986
 Balance of Power (band), a British melodic progressive metal group formed in 1995
 Balance of Power (novel), by Brian Stableford, 1979
 "Balance of Power" (Red Dwarf), a 1988 TV episode
 "The Balance of Power" (Minder), a 1984 TV episode
 Balance of Power (play-by-mail game)
 Balance of Power (Star Trek), a 1994 novel by Dafydd Ab Hugh
 Balance of Power (video game), 1985
Balance of Power: The 1990 Edition

See also

 Power Balance, a brand of hologram bracelets
 Separation of powers, a model of governance characterized by checks and balances among branches of government
 Consociationalism, a form of government involving guaranteed group representation
 Balance of terror
 Balance of threat